Jeanne de Montfort de Chambéon (1250 - 1300) was a House of Savoy noblewoman. She was baroness of Vaud by marriage to Louis I of Vaud, and regent during the minority of her son Jean I in 1278-1290.

References 
 Jean Marie de La Mure, Histoire des ducs de Bourbon et des comtes de Forez, 1809, Éditions Potier, 535 pages ; pages 288 à 298.

House of Savoy
1250 births
1300 deaths
13th-century nobility
13th-century women rulers
Burials at Hautecombe Abbey